The Duchy of Warsaw was a feudal district duchy in Masovia, centered on the Warsaw Land. Its capital was Warsaw.

The state was established in 1310, in the partition of the Duchy of Masovia, with duke Siemowit II of Masovia becoming its first leader. It existed until 5 November 1370, when, under the rule of duke Siemowit III, duchies of Czersk, Rawa, and Warsaw were unified into the Duchy of Masovia. It was again reestablished in June 1381, in the partition of the Duchy of Masovia, with duke Janusz I of Warsaw as its first leader. It existed until 1488, when it got incorporated into the Duchy of Czersk.

From 1310 to 1320, it was a fiefdom within the Kingdom of Poland, and from 1320 to 1385, a fiefdom of the United Kingdom of Poland, and from 1386 to 1488, a fiefdom of the Crown of the Kingdom of Poland.

List of rulers

First state 
 Siemowit II of Masovia (1310–1313)
 Trojden I (1313–1341)
 Siemowit III and Casimir I of Warsaw (1341–1349)
 Casimir I of Warsaw (1349–1355)
 Siemowit III (1355–1370)

Second state 
 Janusz I of Warsaw (1381–1429)
 Bolesław IV of Warsaw (1429–1454) ( as the regent from 1429 to 1436)
 Casimir III of Płock, Konrad III Rudy, Bolesław V of Warsaw and Janusz II of Płock (1455–1471) (Barbara Aleksandrówna and Paweł Giżycki as regents from 1455 to 1462)
 Bolesław V of Warsaw (1471–1481)

Citations

Notes

References

Bibliography 
Janusz Grabowski, Dynastia Piastów Mazowieckich.
Anna Suprunik, Mazowsze Siemowitów.
J. Krzyżaniakowa, J. Ochmański, Władysław II Jagiełło

Former countries in Europe
Former monarchies of Europe
Duchies of Poland
Fiefdoms of Poland
History of Poland during the Piast dynasty
History of Masovia
Duchy of Warsaw Middle Ages
14th-century establishments in Poland
14th-century disestablishments in Poland
15th-century disestablishments in Poland
States and territories established in 1310
States and territories disestablished in 1370
States and territories established in 1381
States and territories disestablished in 1488
Former duchies